Nub Tola (Khmer: ណុប តុលា; born 1 October 1995) is a Cambodian footballer who plays as a defender.

Career
A one club man since his debut in 2013, Tola started out as a forward before he was converted into a defender by former Cambodia national team coach Lee Tae-Hoon, and soon established himself as one of Cambodia's most promising defender. An intelligent player who has often been praised for his ability to read the game, Tola has also been deployed as a defensive midfielder by former PKR Svay Rieng FC coach Sam Vandeth and former national team coach Prak Sovannara. 
But after the arrival of Irish coach Conor Nester at the start of the 2018 MCL season, Tola was converted back to a forward and was given the number 9 shirt.

External links

References

1995 births
Living people
Association football forwards
Association football defenders
Cambodian footballers
Cambodia international footballers
Sportspeople from Phnom Penh
Preah Khan Reach Svay Rieng FC players
Nagaworld FC players
Competitors at the 2017 Southeast Asian Games
Southeast Asian Games competitors for Cambodia
21st-century Cambodian people